Daniel Paulo da Cruz, commonly known as Daniel Cruz, is a Brazilian footballer who plays as a forward.

Career
A product of the youth systems of Guarani and later Corinthians, Daniel Cruz spent the first year of his career playing lower division Campeonato Paulista football with Taboão da Serra and EC São Bernardo. His breakthrough into national division football came outside Brazil, with El Salvador Primera División Once Municipal. He arrived on trial in August 2012 and stayed until the end of the season, scoring twice in his debut against UES, the club's only win of the 2012 Apertura, and being released in November.

Returning to Brazil, he again played lower division state football in both Campeonato Mineiro and Campeonato Paulista before being noticed as top scorer in the 2013 Campeonato Alagoano for Santa Rita and being signed by CRB for 2015 Campeonato Brasileiro Série B. In January 2016 he signed for Botafogo-PB to play Campeonato Paraibano and 2016 Copa do Nordeste, leaving in March by mutual agreement to join Boa Esporte and play in 2016 Campeonato Brasileiro Série C. He had a good league campaign with Boa Esporte, scoring seven goals as the team went on to win the title.

Daniel Cruz returned to Alagoas with CSA in time for the 2017 season, but did not find regular game time there, or with São Caetano whom he joined in March of the same year. At the end of São Caetano's state campaign he was loaned to ABC who were struggling at the start of 2017 Campeonato Brasileiro Série C. At the end of the season he joined Caxias do Sul.

In April 2018 Daniel Cruz joined Boa Esporte for a second time, and played a large part in their 2018 Campeonato Brasileiro Série B season. At the end of the season he moved to Brasil de Pelotas with teammate Douglas Baggio.

References

External links
 

Living people
1990 births
Brazilian footballers
Association football forwards
Clube Atlético Taboão da Serra players
Once Municipal footballers
Democrata Futebol Clube players
Clube de Regatas Brasil players
Botafogo Futebol Clube (PB) players
Boa Esporte Clube players
Centro Sportivo Alagoano players
Associação Desportiva São Caetano players
Sociedade Esportiva e Recreativa Caxias do Sul players
ABC Futebol Clube players
Grêmio Esportivo Brasil players
Campeonato Brasileiro Série B players
Campeonato Brasileiro Série C players
Primera División de Fútbol Profesional players
Sportspeople from Niterói